Yash Pal Ghai CBE (born 20 October 1938) is a Kenyan academic in constitutional law. As of 2007 he is the head of the Constitution Advisory Support Unit of the United Nations Development Programme in Nepal. Until 2008, he was a Special Representative of the UN Secretary General in Cambodia on human rights. In September 2008, he resigned his post, following bitter arguments with the Government of Cambodia.  He has been a Fellow of the British Academy since 2005.

Early life and education
His grandparents were from the Khukhrain family-group of Khatris, who came from the Punjab region of North India, and were part of the waves of Indian migration in East Africa, sponsored by the British Empire. His father sent Ghai to Oxford University to study.

Career
He was the Sir YK Pao Professor of Public Law at the University of Hong Kong starting in 1989. He has been an Honorary Professor there since his retirement in 2005. Prior to that, Ghai taught and did research in law at the University of Warwick, Uppsala University in Sweden, the International Legal Center in New York City, and Yale Law School. He has also taught courses at the University of Wisconsin Law School, as part of an exchange program.
He was the Chairman of the Constitution of Kenya Review Commission (which attempted to write a modern constitution for Kenya) from 2000 to 2004. Professor Ghai is also recently selected by the Fijian Military Government to be the Chairperson of Fiji's Constitutional Committee.

Ghai has also advised and assisted NGOs on human rights law-related work. He drafted the Asian Human Rights Charter—A People's Charter, a project of the Asian Human Rights Commission.

Ghai has written several books on law in Africa, the Pacific islands, and elsewhere.

Honours and awards
Professor Ghai has received the following honours and awards:

Honours
: Independence Medal, 1976
: Independence Medal, 1979 
: Queen's Medal for Distinguished Service, 1980
: Commander of The Most Excellent Order of the British Empire, 1980

Awards
2001: Distinguished Research Achievement Award from the University of Hong Kong

Honorary
University of the South Pacific, Honorary degree, 1995
Society for Advanced Legal Studies, Honorary fellow, 1997
Law Society of Kenya, Honorary Life Member, 1998
 Queen's University, Canada, Honorary Doctorate of Laws (LLD), 2014

References

External links
ResearcherPage, The HKU Scholars Hub
Professor Ghai's column on The Star newspaper

1938 births
Living people
Punjabi people
Punjabi Hindus
Kenyan academics
Members of the Middle Temple
Commanders of the Order of the British Empire
Corresponding Fellows of the British Academy
United Nations special rapporteurs
Academic staff of the University of Dar es Salaam
Academics of the University of Warwick
Kenyan people of Indian descent
Kenyan people of Punjabi descent
Academic staff of the University of Hong Kong
Harvard Law School alumni
Kenyan expatriates in Fiji
Academic staff of Uppsala University
Yale Law School faculty
Alumni of the University of Oxford
Kenyan officials of the United Nations
Special Representatives of the Secretary-General of the United Nations